Gnomidolon bellum is a species of beetle in the family Cerambycidae. It was described by Martins and Galileo in 2002.

References

Gnomidolon
Beetles described in 2002